Granite Falls is a town in Caldwell County, North Carolina, United States. The population was 4,722 at the 2010 census. It is part of the Hickory–Lenoir–Morganton Metropolitan Statistical Area.

History
The name Granite Falls comes from the waters that splash over the granite boulders spanning Gunpowder Creek. In 1791, pioneer Andrew Baird saw that he could operate an iron works beside Gunpowder Creek, and in doing so, became owner of all the land now occupied by the Town of Granite Falls. The community would start to form from that point. Granite Falls was incorporated as a town in 1899. Before its incorporation, Granite Falls went by many other names such as Baird's Forge, Catawba View, Lovelady, and Granite.

Geography
Granite Falls is located near the southern border of Caldwell County at  (35.800345, -81.432929). It is bordered to the south by the town of Rhodhiss, to the southwest by Rhodhiss Lake on the Catawba River (Lake Hickory), and to the west by the town of Sawmills. The center of town is located on a ridge between the Catawba River to the west and Gunpowder Creek, a tributary of the Catawba, to the east.

US 321 Alternate runs through the center of Granite Falls as North and South Main Street.

Demographics

2020 census

As of the 2020 United States census, there were 4,965 people, 1,799 households, and 1,344 families residing in the town.

2000 census
As of the census of 2000, there were 4,612 people, 1,758 households, and 1,211 families residing in the town. The population density was 1,080.4 people per square mile (417.0/km2). There were 1,849 housing units at an average density of 433.1 per square mile (167.2/km2). The racial makeup of the town was 92.06% White, 2.34% African American, 0.17% Native American, 0.39% Asian, 0.07% Pacific Islander, 3.95% from other races, and 1.02% from two or more races. Hispanic or Latino of any race were 6.07% of the population.

There were 1,758 households, out of which 33.9% had children under the age of 18 living with them, 52.3% were married couples living together, 12.9% had a female householder with no husband present, and 31.1% were non-families. 25.4% of all households were made up of individuals, and 11.8% had someone living alone who was 65 years of age or older. The average household size was 2.53 and the average family size was 3.01.

In the town, the population was spread out, with 24.4% under the age of 18, 8.8% from 18 to 24, 31.1% from 25 to 44, 20.7% from 45 to 64, and 15.0% who were 65 years of age or older. The median age was 36 years. For every 100 females, there were 89.4 males. For every 100 females age 18 and over, there were 84.9 males.

The median income for a household in the town was $38,596, and the median income for a family was $47,064. Males had a median income of $28,309 versus $21,374 for females. The per capita income for the town was $17,750. About 5.7% of families and 8.2% of the population were below the poverty line, including 10.6% of those under age 18 and 9.7% of those age 65 or over.

92% of larceny calls to police in Granite Falls are related to the local Walmart.

Education

High school
South Caldwell High School (Hudson address)

Middle school
Granite Falls Middle School

Elementary schools
Baton Elementary School
Dudley Shoals Elementary School
Granite Falls Elementary School
Sawmills Elementary School

Alternative school
Gateway School (grades 6–12)

Media
 Kicks 103.3, Kicks 103.3, local radio station
 WJRI, News Talk 1340 WJRI, local radio station
 WKGX, AM 1080 WKGX, local radio station
 WYCV AM 900, local radio station

Notable people
Madison Bumgarner, MLB pitcher, 3x World Series Champion and 2014 World Series MVP
Eric Church, country music singer-songwriter
Linda Combs, former U.S. federal government official
Jack Curtis, former MLB player
Cyndee Peters, American-Swedish gospel singer and author
Edgar V. Starnes, politician and real estate investor
Amy H. Sturgis, author, speaker, and scholar of science fiction/fantasy studies and Native American studies
Maxie Williams, former NFL player

References

External links
 
 Films of Granite Falls, NC, by H. Lee Waters, 1938-1940.

Towns in Caldwell County, North Carolina
North Carolina populated places on the Catawba River
Year of establishment missing